The 1996–97 Northern Premier League season was the 29th in the history of the Northern Premier League, a football competition in England. Teams were divided into two divisions; the Premier and the First. It was known as the Unibond League for sponsorship reasons.

Premier Division 

The Premier League featured three new teams:

 Alfreton Town promoted as runners-up from Division One
 Lancaster City promoted as champions from Division One
 Runcorn relegated from the Football Conference

League table

Results

Division One 

Division One featured four new teams:

 Droylsden relegated from the Premier Division
 Flixton promoted as champions from the NWCFL Division One
 Matlock Town relegated from the Premier Division
 Stocksbridge Park Steels promoted as runners-up from the NCEFL Premier Division

League table

Promotion and relegation 

In the twenty-ninth season of the Northern Premier League Leek Town (as champions) were automatically promoted to the Football Conference. Witton Albion and Buxton were relegated to the First Division while Knowsley United left the League at the end of the season.  Boston United moved to the Southern League.  These clubs were replaced by relegated Conference side Altrincham, First Division winners Radcliffe Borough and second placed Leigh RMI. In the First Division Curzon Ashton, Warrington Town and Atherton Laburnum Rovers left the League at the end of the season and were replaced by newly admitted Whitby Town, Belper Town and Trafford.

Cup Results
Challenge Cup: Teams from both leagues.

Gainsborough Trinity bt. Boston United

President's Cup: 'Plate' competition for losing teams in the NPL Cup.

Blyth Spartans bt. Runcorn

Peter Swales Shield: Between Champions of NPL Premier Division and Winners of the NPL Cup.

Gainsborough Trinity bt. Leek Town

References

External links 
 Northern Premier League Tables at RSSSF

Northern Premier League seasons
6